The Quebec WCT (also known as Quebec Open in 1973) was a men's tennis tournament played in Quebec City, Quebec, Canada as part of the World Championship Tennis from 1971 to 1972 and the Grand Prix tennis circuit in 1973.

Finals

Singles

Doubles

References
Association of Tennis Professionals (ATP) - tournament profile

World Championship Tennis
Defunct tennis tournaments in Canada
Indoor tennis tournaments
Tennis in Quebec